Yichʼaak Bʼalam was a Maya king of Seibal.

Biography
In AD 735 Uchaʼan Kʼin Bʼalam - the fourth king of Dos Pilas kingdom - attacked Seibal, capturing Yichʼaak Bʼalam. The captive king was not executed but rather became a vassal of his more powerful neighbour. Yichʼaak Bʼalam is shown under the feet of Uchaʼan Kʼin Bʼalam on Aguateca Stela 2.

Yichʼaak Bʼalam continued as a vassal under the next king of Dos Pilas, Kʼawiil Chan Kʼinich, who presided over rituals at Seibal in 745 and 747.

Notes

Kings of Seibal
8th century in Guatemala